Protestants in Russia constitute 1–2% (i.e. 1.5 million – 3 million adherents) of the overall population of the country. Additionally there are around 15.000-20.000 Dukhobors and 40.000 Molokans in Russia, who have similarities to Protestantism. By 2004, there were 4,435 registered Protestant societies representing 21% of all registered religious organizations, which is second place after Eastern Orthodoxy. By contrast in 1992 the Protestants reportedly had 510 organizations in Russia.

Many missionaries operating in the country are from Protestant denominations. According to a global survey conducted at the end of 2013, 1% of surveyed Russians identify as Protestants.

History

The first Protestant churches (Lutheran, Reformed) in Russia appeared in the 16th and 17th centuries in major towns and cities such as Moscow in connection with expatriate communities from western Europe. The Lutheran churches, in particular, represented a sizeable minority in pre-1917 Russia.

In the 18th century, under Czarina Catherine II (the Great), large numbers of German settlers were invited to Russia, including Mennonites, Lutherans, Reformed and also Roman Catholics.

The first Russian Baptist communities arose in unrelated strains in three widely separated regions of the Russian Empire (Transcaucasia, Ukraine, and St. Petersburg) in the 1860s and 1870s.

From the information of Christian History Institute, the number of Baptists in Russia significantly grew after World War I. Some Russian prisoners were converted by German missionaries and returned home to preach to others. The 1920s saw new opportunities for missionary work as the Bolshevik regime initially seemed to offer an olive branch to those identified as ‘sectarians’. In the 1930s, Stalinist repression decimated church life, with many arrests and church closures, but this was not the end of the story. The Second World War saw a relaxation of church-state relations in the Soviet Union and the Protestant community benefited alongside their Russian Orthodox counterparts. The immediate post-war period saw the growth of Baptist and Pentecostal congregations and there was a religious revival in these years. Statistics provided by the leaders of the registered church suggest 250,000 baptised members in 1946 rising to 540,000 by 1958. In fact the influence of the Protestantism was much wider than these figures suggest: in addition to the existence of unregistered Baptist and Pentecostal groups, there were also thousands who attended worship without taking baptism. Many Baptist and Pentecostal congregations were in Ukraine. Women significantly outnumbered men in these congregations, though the pastors were male.

Although the Soviet state had established the All-Union Council of Evangelical Christians-Baptists in 1944, and encouraged congregations to register, this did not signal the end to the persecution of Christians.  Many leaders and ordinary believers of different Protestant communities fell victims to the persecution by Communist regime, including imprisonment. The leader of the Seventh-day Adventist movement in the Soviet Union Vladimir Shelkov (1895–1980) spent almost his entire life after 1931 in prison and died in a camp in Yakutia. Pentecostals were given 20–25 year prison terms en masse and many perished there, including one of the leaders of the movement, Ivan Voronaev.

In the period after the Second World War, Protestant believers in the USSR (Baptists, Pentecostals, Adventists etc.) were forced into mental hospitals and endured trials and imprisonment (often for refusal to enter military service). Some were even deprived of their parental rights.

Forerunners and local reform movements 
The history of indigenous, Russian evangelical Protestantism was anticipated by movements such as the Strigolniki in the 14th century and later in the 16th–18th centuries the Molokan, Dukhobor, Khlysts, to some extent, Subbotniks, and in 19th century Tolstoyan rural communes, who prepared the ground for the movement's future spread. The first evidence on some of the above communes' existence appeared in 16th – 17th centuries. Many of the above communities emigrated to Canada, the United States and Latin America in 19th and 20th centuries.

The Strigolniki were followers of a Russian religious sect in the middle of the 14th and first half of the 15th century, they had Iconoclastic tendencies and some proto-Protestant characteristics. According to Karetnikova, the Strigolniki were a response to changes in the Orthodox church, the Strigolniki wanted to return from ritualism to the simplicity of New Testament Christianity, emphasizing the spiritual meaning of the sacraments and basing their views on scripture. The Strigolniki opposed the Orthodox church, refusing to recognize its bishops and priests. Active participants of the sect were tradespeople and low-ranking clergy. They renounced all ecclesiastic hierarchy and monasticism, sacraments done by Orthodox clergy: priesthood, communion, penance, and baptism, which had been accompanied by large fees ("extortions", in their view) to the benefit of the clergy. Criticizing and exposing the venality, vices, and ignorance of the priests, the Strigolniki demanded the right to a religious sermon for laymen. Their sermons were full of social motifs: they reproached the rich for enslaving the free and the poor.

The Molokans had multiple Protestant-like aspects, they rejected the Orthodox priesthood, icons, had their own presbyters, they held the bible as their main guide and interpreted the sacraments "spiritually", being in many ways similar to the Quakers. The Molokans had multiple sects branched off them, including: Detei Khrista or Mokrye Molokane 'wet Molokans' were a Molokan group who practiced water baptism, the Sukhie Baptisty were Molokans who merged with Baptists, practicing spiritual baptism instead of water baptism, one congregation still exists in Georgia.

The Dukhobors additionally had multiple similarities to Anabaptists and mostly to the Quakers, for example by holding to pacifism. However the Dukhobors also have major differences from Anabaptists, especially by denying sola scriptura, instead believing in continual revelation. The Doukhobors have maintained close association with Mennonites and Quakers due to similar religious practices; all of these groups are collectively considered to be peace churches due to their belief in pacifism.

Bible translation 

The first attempts to translate the books of the Bible into the contemporary Russian language as an alternative to the older Church Slavonic, by that time used primarily in liturgical settings among Eastern Slavs, took place in the 16th and 17th centuries. But the mentioned works (by the deacon of Posolsky Prikaz Avraamiy Firsov, pastor E.Gluk, archbishop Methodiy (Smirnov)) were lost during political turbulence and wars.

The full-scale Bible translation into the Russian language began in 1813 after the establishment of the Russian Bible Society. The full edition of the Bible with the Old Testament and New Testament was published in 1876. This work, also called the Russian Synodal Bible, is widely used by Protestant communities all over Russia and the former USSR countries. Several modern translations have recently appeared. The Russian Bible Society since its establishment in 1813 and up to 1826 distributed more than 500 thousand copies of Bible related books in 41 languages in Russia. Several times in the 19th and 20th centuries the activities of the Society were stopped due to the reactionary policies of the Russian Government.

The Russian Bible Society was reinstated in 1990–1991 after an interruption due to restrictions under the Soviet regime.

The opening ceremony of the Building of the Russian Bible Society in Moscow was attended by representatives of the Orthodox, Roman Catholic, and Protestant churches, who joined efforts in the cause of Bible translation and distribution. The publications by the Russian Bible Society are based on the shared doctrine of the early Christian church and include non-confessional commentary. Over 1,000,000 Bible-related books are printed every year. The Bible is also being translated into the native languages and dialects of Russia's ethnic groups.

Present time

The major groupings of Protestants in Russia today are the Evangelical Christians — Baptists (most numerous), Pentecostals, Charismatics, Adventists,  Lutherans (with largest churches being Evangelical Lutheran Church in Russia, Ukraine, Kazakhstan and Central Asia and the Evangelical Lutheran Church of Ingria), Presbyterians (mainly of Korean origin), Anglicans, Spiritual Christians and the
New Apostolic Church. Virtually all Protestant denominations are represented in the country.

Some Protestants (especially at provincial level) report encountering obstruction by local authorities of their activities and government restrictions. In April 2007, the European Court of Human Rights obliged Russian state to pay EUR 10,000 (ten thousand euros) as a non-pecuniary damage for the refusal in registration of the Moscow branch of Salvation Army. In April 2017, the Supreme Court of Russia labeled Jehovah's Witnesses an extremist organization, banned its activities in Russia and issued an order to confiscate the organization's assets.

See also
Christianity in Russia
Evangelical Lutheran Church "Concord"
Slavic Christianity
Union of Evangelical Christians-Baptists of Russia
Shtundists

References

External links
 English language page of the Russian Bible Society
 Institute for Bible translation in Russia/CIS
 Russian Baptists Union, in Russian
 Russian Church of Christians of Evangelical Faith (Pentecostals)
Protestant Communities in the Soviet Union (oral history, archive documents, and analysis)

 
History of Christianity in Russia
Russia